Robert L. Ord (born November 23, 1968) is an American businessman and the founder of Falken Industries.

Early life and education 
Ord was born on November 23, 1968. He grew up in the small waterfront private community of Sherwood Forest, Maryland. In 1983 Ord's parents were forced to claim bankruptcy due to a poor business dealing by his father. He focused on self-development through Martial Arts. 

He graduated from Annapolis Sr. High School in 1987 and attended Anne Arundel County Community College and received an associate degree in 1990. Ord attended the University of South Carolina in 1990 to 1993 and obtained an MBA from Templeton University in 1999. Ord studied martial arts from the age of 4 and by 15 had obtained a black belt in Jujitsu and Karate.

He continued to study all martial arts and was eventually honored into the International Martial Art Hall of Fame in 2000. It was Ord's Martial Art dedication that molded his career into Law Enforcement and Security. Currently, He is considered one of the world's top defensive tactics instructors and he has developed training programs for the US Army and The US State Department.

Career 
In 1995 Ord was promoted as Deputy Director of the United States Police Defensive Tactics Association and developed training courses for Law Enforcement organizations around the world. During this time frame, Ord also graduated from the South West Florida Criminal Justice Academy in 2000 and was a Deputy Sheriff for a Florida Sheriffs Department. Ord moved to Culpeper, Virginia and became a Deputy Sheriff with the Culpeper County Sheriffs Department.

In 2003 Ord founded the Virginia Security company Falken Industries with under $600.00 . He was divorced, living his parents basement and was committed to restarting his life. By 2017 Ord had made over 10 million dollars with his company. Ord provided private law enforcement officers under the Virginia Statute affording Private Security Law Enforcement Power and the tile “Police”. His authority and experience of private police, Police training and Sheriffs office training have been called to examine the VA code on the special powers of the Special Conservator of the Peace, or SCOP. Robert Ord sued the District of Columbia in 2008 and the case gathered national attention. Ord was a Law Enforcement Officer threatened by prosecution of The District of Columbia's gun laws. Ord pursued DC under appeal. United States Court of Appeals, District of Columbia Circuit. Robert L. ORD, Appellant v. DISTRICT OF COLUMBIA, Appellee. No. 08-7094.Decided: December 4, 2009 Attorney The amicus curiae lawyers, Alan Gura of Gura & Possessky and Art Spitzer of the ACLU National Capital Area, say the D.C. Circuit has adopted too narrow a standard to prove standing, effectively limiting access to the courts.

Attorney Gura had become famous for another firearms case decided in the US Supreme court. District of Columbia v. Heller, 554 U.S. 570 (2008), is a landmark case in which the Supreme Court of the United States held in a 5–4 decision that the Second Amendment protects an individual's right to possess a firearm unconnected with service in a militia for traditionally lawful purposes, such as self-defense within the home. Ord's original case was dismissed and upon appeal the U.S. District court found that Ord had sufficient cause to pursue his case."this circuit has offered a wary allegiance to the imminence standard, first articulated in Navegar, Inc. v. United States, 103 F.3d 994, 998 (D.C.Cir.1997). Today's opinion labors to extend that line of cases, barring preenforcement claims for declaratory relief unless the plaintiff can show a threat of imminent prosecution, and thus denying access to Article III courts to District of Columbia litigants seeking vindication of civil rights claims-access they would have under applicable Supreme Court precedent.  Whether Ord's allegations meet Navegar's stringent standard is a close question, but this controversy demonstrates why litigants should not be required to jump through such hoops to get past the courthouse door.  Consequently, while I agree Ord has standing to bring his claim for damages under 42 U.S.C. § 198"

His case was supported by the ACLU and The Second Amendment Foundation. Ord vs DC is also a duly noted case and foundation for filings under pre enforcement standing and case law.

Falken 
On September 4, 2011, The Washington Post highlighted Ords company, Falken Industries and the unique connection and employment for returning US Veterans. Ord later lost this contract due to an employee who subversively stole the contract and was sued by Ord.

In December 2015, Ord was called as a subject matter expert of Police and Defensive tactics for the Washington Post. The article and its contents later won a Pulitzer prize.

In July 2016, Falken Industries became a leader in employee treatment and was awarded the number 1 small business organization in 2016 by the Washington Post. In January 2017, Falken Industries was awarded a 5-year contract for Security Services for the General Service Administration (GSA) for 2.7 million dollars under contract 'GS07F027GA.' Ords story was highlighted on I Heart Radio in May 2017.

References

External links 
 Official Website

1968 births
Living people
21st-century American businesspeople